Naor Gilon (Hebrew: נאור גילאון) is Israel's ambassador to India and non resident ambassador to Sri Lanka and Bhutan. He was  ambassador of Israel to the Netherlands (2019-2021), Italy and  San Marino (Feb 2012 – Aug 2016).

Biography
Naor Gilon was born in Israel. His father was from Germany, and was a Holocaust survivor. Gilon received his BA in political science at Tel Aviv University and his Master's degree summa cum laude in international relations at Corvinus University of Budapest. He is married with four children.

Diplomatic career
Gilon joined the Ministry of Foreign Affairs in 1989 and served as the deputy chief of missions at the Embassy of Israel in Hungary (1990–1995), deputy foreign policy advisor to the prime minister (1995–1997), counselor for political affairs at the permanent mission to the United Nations (1997–2000), and as director of the Division for Strategic and Military Affairs in the Center for Policy Research in Ministry of Foreign Affairs (2000–2002).

As a minister-counselor for political affairs at the Embassy of Israel in Washington, D.C., he was the subject of FBI investigations into the Lawrence Franklin espionage scandal, which involved the leaking of classified information by an employee at the United States Department of Defense.

According to Israeli journalist Shmuel Rosner, Gilon's return to the U.S. in late 2005 was an indication that "no serious allegations concerning Israel's involvement in the American Israel Public Affairs Committee (AIPAC) affair still exist."

In 2009, he served as the chief of staff to Minister of Foreign Affairs Avigdor Lieberman and as the deputy director general for Western Europe division at the Ministry of Foreign Affairs from 2009 to 2011

In 2021, it was announced that he would be the new ambassador of Israel to India. On October 27, he presented his credentials to President of India Ram Nath Kovind.

References

1964 births
Living people
Israeli Jews
Tel Aviv University alumni
Corvinus University of Budapest alumni
Ambassadors of Israel to Italy
Ambassadors of Israel to the Netherlands
Ambassadors of Israel to India
Ambassadors of Israel to Sri Lanka
Ambassadors to Bhutan
Israeli people of German-Jewish descent